In 2010, Kent County Cricket Club competed in Division One of the County Championship, Group C of the 40-over Clydesdale Bank 40 and the South Group of the Friends Provident t20. Kent also hosted three-day first-class matches at the St Lawrence Ground against Loughborough MCCU and the touring Pakistanis. It was the first season in charge for Director of Cricket Paul Farbrace. The club captain was former England batsman Rob Key who had been club captain since 2006. Kent's overseas players were South African fast bowler Makhaya Ntini until late May, and Sri Lankan leg-spinner Malinga Bandara for the rest of the season.

Kent were relegated from Division One of the County Championship in their first season since promotion from Division Two. They finished second in Group C of the Clydesdale Bank 40 and seventh in the South Group of the Friends Provident t20 (they did not progress to the knock-out stages of either competition).

Squad
It was announced in December 2009 that former South Africa batsman Justin Kemp would not return for the 2010 season due to changes to the Kolpak regulations under which he had been able to play county cricket since 2005. Kent had already lost fast bowler Martin Saggers after 11 seasons, when the player announced his retirement at the end of the 2009 season due to a serious knee injury.

In January, Kent announced that their overseas player would be Australian fast bowler Stuart Clark for the first half of the season, followed by Sri Lankan leg-spinner Malinga Bandara for the second half of the season. Clark had previously signed to play for Kent in the 2009 season, but later withdrew due to a late call up to the Australian tour of South Africa. However, in March 2010 it was announced that, for a second time, Clark would not play for the county – this time due to concerns about his fitness. A week later, Kent announced the signing of South African fast bowler Makhaya Ntini as a replacement for Clark. Ntini signed a five-week deal to play until Bandara arrived in late May.

South African-born Scotland international, Dewald Nel, signed a two-year contract with Kent in March 2010 after impressing while on trial.

Leg-spin bowler Mark Lawson (cricketer) signed for Kent during the season and played a single match (against the touring Pakistanis), but was later released.

In late July, Kent released slow left-arm spinner Rob Ferley 22 year-old medium-fast bowler Warren Lee). Lee would go on to play for the Unicorns (cricket team) in 2012 and 2013. A few days later, Kent released James Hockley from his second spell with the county. Hockley would now concentrate on his teaching career. Phil Edwards was released in late August.

Fast bowler Amjad Khan left Kent at the end of the 2010 season to join Sussex, having been at the county since 2001. Second XI wicket-keeper Paul Dixey also left after the end of the season and signed for Leicestershire.

Squad list
 Ages given as of the first day of the County Championship season, 9 April 2010.

County Championship

Division One

Matches

Other first-class matches

MCCU match

Tour match

Clydesdale Bank 40

Group A

Matches

Friends Life t20

South Division

Matches

Statistics

Batting

Bowling

References

External links

Kent home at ESPN cricinfo
Kent County Cricket Club official site

2010
2010 in English cricket